Westover Hills is a town in Tarrant County, Texas, United States. The population was 682 at the 2010 census.

In 2000, Westover Hills was the wealthiest location in Texas by per capita income and the 12th highest-income place in the United States. It has since been surpassed in Texas by both Piney Point Village and Barton Creek. It is still the wealthiest suburb of Ft. Worth, Texas.

Geography

Westover Hills is located at  (32.745630, –97.415131).

According to the United States Census Bureau, the town has a total area of 0.7 square miles (1.8 km), all of it land.

Demographics

2020 census

As of the 2020 United States census, there were 641 people, 300 households, and 247 families residing in the town.

2000 census
At the 2000 census there were 658 people, 258 households, and 211 families in the town. The population density was 920.9 people per square mile (357.8/km). There were 273 housing units at an average density of 382.1 per square mile (148.5/km).  The racial makeup of the town was 98.33% White, 0.76% Asian, and 0.91% from two or more races. Hispanic or Latino of any race were 1.52%.

Of the 258 households 26.4% had children under the age of 18 living with them, 79.1% were married couples living together, 1.9% had a female householder with no husband present, and 18.2% were non-families. 15.9% of households were one person and 9.7% were one person aged 65 or older. The average household size was 2.55 and the average family size was 2.86.

The age distribution was 24.0% under the age of 18, 2.0% from 18 to 24, 17.0% from 25 to 44, 35.4% from 45 to 64, and 21.6% 65 or older. The median age was 51 years. For every 100 females, there were 94.1 males. For every 100 females age 18 and over, there were 89.4 males.

The median household income was in excess $200,000, as is the median family income . Males had a median income of over $100,000 versus $45,417 for females. The per capita income for the town was $133,558. About 1.0% of families and 2.5% of the population were below the poverty line, including 3.8% of those under age 18 and 2.8% of those age 65 or over.

Politics

The city of Westover Hills is one of the most reliably Republican jurisdictions in the state of Texas. Every GOP presidential candidate since Thomas Dewey in 1948 has carried the city by over 25 points, with Dwight Eisenhower, Ronald Reagan, and George H. W. Bush each earning over 90% of the vote in 1952, 1956, 1984 and 1988 respectively. In his 1998 gubernatorial re-election bid,  George W. Bush would also top 90%  Among the Democratic candidates for president, only Lyndon Johnson in 1964 has ever come within 30 points of carrying Westover Hills.

In 1944, Franklin Delano Roosevelt finished third in the city, behind Dewey, and the unpledged Texas Regulars third party, who won the city with over three quarters of the vote.

All presidential election results for Westover Hills since 1944, and all gubernatorial results since 1998 are listed below:

Education 
Westover Hills is in the Fort Worth Independent School District.

Westover Hills is served by:
 Mary Louise Phillips Elementary School
 Phillips was built in 1949. It was named after Mary Louise Phillips, the first female board member of FWISD.
 Monnig Middle School
 Arlington Heights High School

However, most families choose to send their children to private schools, typically Fort Worth Country Day School, but also All Saints' Episcopal School and Trinity Valley School, all three of which participate in the Southwestern Preparatory Conference.

References

External links
 Town of Westover Hills official website

Towns in Tarrant County, Texas
Towns in Texas
Dallas–Fort Worth metroplex
Enclaves in the United States